Two Danish royal yachts have borne the name Dannebrog:

 was a royal yacht launched in 1879, in Copenhagen.
 is a 1,238-ton royal yacht launched in 1931, by the Naval Dockyard in Copenhagen.

References

Royal Danish Navy ship names